The Icheon Sports Complex is a multi-use stadium in Icheon, South Korea. The stadium opened in 2001 and is currently used mostly for football matches. It has a capacity for 19,428 people.

References

External links
 World Stadiums

Football venues in South Korea
Sports venues in Gyeonggi Province
Multi-purpose stadiums in South Korea
2001 establishments in South Korea
Sports venues completed in 2001